Nanshan (literally "South[ern] mountain[s]"),  is a common place name in China and adjacent areas:

Geographic locations

China
 Topographic features
 Nanshan, another name for the Nanling Mountains of southern China
 Nanshan Mountains (Shenzhen), a group of two mountains in Shenzhen, China
 Nanshan (Shaanxi), another name for the Qinling Mountains of central China from their position south of the Yellow River
 Nanshan (Gansu), another name for the Qilian Mountains of central China from their position south of the Hexi Corridor
 Nanshan (Heilongjiang), a dormant volcanic peak named for its position at the southern end of the Keluo Mountains
 Nanshan (Chongqing), a part of Tongluo Mountain close to downtown Chongqing
 Battle of Nanshan, fought in 1904 in the southern hills of Jinzhou, Dalian, Liaoning, during the Russo-Japanese War 

Districts 
 Nanshan District, Shenzhen, in Shenzhen, Guangdong
 Nanshan District, Hegang, in Hegang, Heilongjiang
 Nanshan District, Zhuolu County, county-administered district of Zhuolu County, Hebei

Subdistricts
 Nanshan Subdistrict, Ningguo, Anhui; see List of township-level divisions of Anhui
 Nanshan Subdistrict, Chongqing, in Nan'an District, Chongqing; see Cherry blossom
 Nanshan Subdistrict, Shenzhen, in Nanshan District, Shenzhen
 Nanshan Subdistrict, Jixi, in Jiguan District, Jixi, Heilongjiang; see List of township-level divisions of Heilongjiang
 Nanshan Subdistrict, Shuangyashan, in Lingdong District, Shuangyashan, Heilongjiang; see List of township-level divisions of Heilongjiang
 Nanshan Subdistrict, Beipiao, Beipiao, Liaoning
 Nanshan Subdistrict, Pulandian, Pulandian, Liaoning

Towns
 Nanshan, Changting County, in Changting County, Fujian, see List of township-level divisions of Fujian
 Nanshan, Foshan, in Sanshui District, Foshan, Guangdong, see List of township-level divisions of Guangdong
 Nanshan, Jiexi County, in Jiexi County, Guangdong, see List of township-level divisions of Guangdong
 Nanshan, Nanping, in Yanping District, Nanping, Fujian, see List of township-level divisions of Fujian
 Nanshan, Xuwen County, in Xuwen County, Guangdong, see List of township-level divisions of Guangdong

The Philippines
 Nanshan Island, eighth-largest Spratly Island

See also
 南山 (disambiguation), for Chinese, Korean, and Japanese place names and people's names written with these characters
 USS Nanshan (AG-3), collier in the service of the United States Navy
 Namsan (disambiguation), Korean placename with the same spelling in Chinese characters and same meaning as Nanshan
 South Mountain (disambiguation)
 Shannan (disambiguation) containing "山南"